trans-Dichlorodiammineplatinum(II) is the trans isomer of the coordination complex with the formula trans-PtCl2(NH3)2, sometimes called transplatin.  It is a yellow solid with low solubility in water but good solubility in DMF. The existence of two isomers of PtCl2(NH3)2 led Alfred Werner to propose square planar molecular geometry. It belongs to the molecular symmetry point group D2h.

Preparation and reactions
The complex is prepared by treating [Pt(NH3)4]Cl2 with hydrochloric acid.

Many of the reactions of this complex can be explained by the trans effect.  It slowly hydrolyzes in aqueous solution to give the mixed aquo complex trans-[PtCl(H2O)(NH3)2]Cl.  Similarly it reacts with thiourea (tu) to give colorless trans-[Pt(tu)2(NH3)2]Cl2.  In contrast, the cis isomer gives [Pt(tu)4]Cl2.  Oxidative addition of chlorine gives trans-PtCl4(NH3)2.

Medicinal chemistry
trans-Dichlorodiammineplatinum(II) has had far less impact on medicinal chemistry compared to its cis isomer, cisplatin, which is a major anticancer drug.  Nonetheless, replacement of the ammonia with other ligands has led to highly active drugs that have attracted much attention.

References

Ammine complexes
Coordination complexes
Platinum(II) compounds
Chloro complexes
Platinum complexes